Picton Aerodrome  is a Non-Certificated Aerodrome  south of Picton township in the Marlborough District of the South Island in New Zealand. Sounds Air has 5 flights per day to Wellington. The Marlborough Sounds Airpark is located nearby offering 16 private hangars adjacent to the main runway with remote control access for the owners to park their aircraft.
On 2 January 1986, seven people died when a Cessna aircraft crashed on takeoff near Picton. In another accident on 29 January 1996, five died when a Cessna Caravan crashed on approach to Picton.

Airlines and destinations

See also

List of airports in New Zealand
List of airlines of New Zealand
Transport in New Zealand

Sources 
NZAIP Volume 4 AD
AIP New Zealand  (PDF)

References

Airports in New Zealand
Picton, New Zealand
Geography of the Marlborough Region
Transport buildings and structures in the Marlborough Region